Dialects of Fars are a group of southwestern and northwestern Persian dialects spoken in the central Fars province. The southwestern dialects can be divided into three families of dialects according to geographical distribution and local names: Southwestern (Lori), South-central (Kuhmareyi) and Southeastern (Larestani). Under linguistic typology a part of the dialects of the region can be classified as follows:

And the extinct old Kazeruni and Old Shirazi (Sherazi) dialects. This group of dialects is not to be confused with the standard Persian, the official language of Iran; and they are not restricted to the present border of Fars province.

Example

References

Further reading
 
Mahamedi, H., 1979. On the verbal system in three Iranian dialects of Fârs, in Studia Iranica, VIII, 2, 277–297.

External links
Encyclopædia Iranica article on Fars Dialects

Fars Province
Languages of Iran
Southwestern Iranian languages
Endangered Iranian languages